McAusland is a surname. Notable people with the surname include:

John McAusland Denny (1858–1922), Scottish businessman and politician
Kyle McAusland (born 1993), Scottish footballer
Marc McAusland (born 1988), Scottish footballer

See also
McCausland